The following is a list of shopping centres in New Zealand.

For comparison, the largest mall in Canada, the West Edmonton Mall in Edmonton, Alberta, Canada has a retail space of 350,000 m2.  The largest in the United States of America is the 230,000 m2 Mall of America in Bloomington, Minnesota.  Melbourne's Chadstone Shopping Centre, which has been described as the largest shopping centre in the Southern Hemisphere, has 233,664 m2 of retail space.

References

See also

 List of retailers in New Zealand
 Retailing in New Zealand
 Hospitality industry in New Zealand

 
New Zealand
Shopping malls in New Zealand